James Maki may refer to:

 James Maki, a pseudonym of Japanese film director Yasujirō Ozu (1903–1963)
 James Maki, the second person in the United States, and first American male, to undergo a partial-face transplant in 2009